Illerbrun may refer to:

 Illerbrun, Saskatchewan,  unincorporated community in Canada
 Bryan Illerbrun, (1957–2013), Canadian football player